Gwalior South Assembly constituency is one of the 230 Vidhan Sabha (Legislative Assembly) constituencies of Madhya Pradesh state in central India. This constituency came into existence in 2008, following the delimitation of the legislative assembly constituencies.

Overview
Gwalior South (constituency number 17) is one of the 6 Vidhan Sabha constituencies located in Gwalior district. This constituency covers the ward numbers 34, 35 and 37 to 44 and 46 to 55 of the Gwalior Municipal Corporation.

Gwalior South is part of Gwalior Lok Sabha constituency along with six other Vidhan Sabha segments, namely, Gwalior, Gwalior East, Gwalior Rural, Bhitarwar and Dabra in this district.

Members of Legislative Assembly
 2008: Narayan Singh Kushwah, Bharatiya Janata Party
 2013: Narayan Singh Kushwah, Bharatiya Janata Party

Election Results

2018
INC	Praveen Pathak	56,369	37.00%	121
BJP	Narayan Singh Kushwah	56,248	37.00%	
IND	Sameeksha Gupta	30,745	20.00%	
BSP	Aseem Shah	3,098	2.00%	
None Of The Above	1,550	1.00%	
Socialist Unity Centre Of India (Communist)	Comrade Rachna Agrawal	1,147	1.00%

See also
 Gwalior

References

Gwalior
Assembly constituencies of Madhya Pradesh